Cognitive orthotics are software-based personal reminder systems for people with cognitive impairment, such as memory loss. People who can benefit include the elderly, people who have experienced traumatic brain injury, and anyone who experiences memory loss. These devices may be installed on personal digital assistants (PDAs). They may include elements of adaptive programming or artificial intelligence, to accommodate the needs of the individuals more appropriately.

Brand name examples include Autominder and PEAT (Planning and Execution Assistant and Trainer).

See also
Assistive technology
Dementia
Orthotics

Assistive technology